The Victoria ridged frog (Ptychadena aequiplicata) is a species of frog in the family Ptychadenidae. It is found in Benin, Cameroon, Central African Republic, Republic of the Congo, Democratic Republic of the Congo, Ivory Coast, Equatorial Guinea, Gabon, Ghana, Guinea, Liberia, Nigeria, possibly Angola, and possibly Togo. Its natural habitats are subtropical or tropical moist lowland forest, intermittent freshwater marshes, and heavily degraded former forest. It is threatened by habitat loss.

References 

Ptychadena
Taxonomy articles created by Polbot
Amphibians described in 1898